Griffin Colby (born 3 November 1992 in Free State, South Africa) is a rugby referee on the National A Panel of the South African Rugby Union.

Career

He started refereeing in 2013 in Free State, before being promoted to the National Panel in 2018. In 2019, he made his refereeing debut in the Rugby Challenge and the 2019 Currie Cup First Division.

References

Living people
South African rugby union referees
SARU referees
Currie Cup referees
1992 births
People from Bloemfontein
Super Rugby referees